Freiensteinau is a municipality in the Vogelsbergkreis in Hesse, Germany.

Geography

Location
Freiensteinau lies on the southern slopes of the Vogelsberg Mountains.

Neighbouring communities
Freiensteinau borders in the north on the community of Grebenhain, in the northeast on the community of Hosenfeld (Fulda district), in the east on the community of Neuhof (Fulda district), in the south on the town of Steinau an der Straße (Main-Kinzig-Kreis) and in the west on the community of Birstein (Main-Kinzig-Kreis).

Constituent communities
The community consists of the twelve centres of Freiensteinau (administrative seat), Holzmühl, Fleschenbach, Salz, Ober-Moos, Nieder-Moos, Gunzenau, Reichlos, Weidenau, Reinhards, Hessisch Radmühl and Preußisch Radmühl.

Politics

Municipal council
The municipal elections on 26 March 2006 yielded the following results:

Elections in March 2016 
CDU      = 2 seats
SPD      = 3 seats
FW       = 8 seats
UBL      = 4 seats
Bündnis  = 2 seats

Mayors
In July 2014 Sascha Spielberger was elected the new mayor, he started in office in December 2014, and was re-elected in 2020.

Former mayors:
1971–1991: Johannes Karl
1991–2014: Friedel Kopp

Partnerships
  Tourouvre, Normandy, France since 1977

Culture and sightseeing

Music
The organ at the Evangelical Church in Nieder-Moos was built in 1790-1791 by Johann-Markus Oestreich from Oberbimbach near Fulda. Every year, the Nieder-Mooser Sommerkonzerte (Nieder-Moos Summer Concerts) take place around the organ.

Sundry
A curious fact about the community's political history is that before Hesse's municipal reforms in the 1970s, the 12 constituent communities nowadays within Freiensteinau not only were not united, but even belonged to four different districts: Fulda, Gelnhausen, Lauterbach and Schlüchtern.

References

Vogelsbergkreis
Grand Duchy of Hesse